Tatar-e Sofla (also Romanized as Tātār-e Soflá; also known as Tātār-e Pā’īn and Nātār-e Pā’īn) is a village in Daland Rural District, in the Central District of Ramian County, Golestan Province, Iran. At the 2006 census, its population was 1,759, in 314 families.

References 

Populated places in Ramian County